Varvažov is a municipality and village in Písek District in the South Bohemian Region of the Czech Republic. It has about 200 inhabitants. The historic centre of the village is well preserved and is protected by law as a village monument zone.

Administrative parts
Villages of Štědronín-Plazy and Zbonín are administrative parts of Varvažov.

Geography
It lies in the Tábor Uplands.

Most of the municipal border is formed by rivers. The western border is formed by the Skalice River. After its confluence with the Skalice, the southern border is formed by the Lomnice. After its confluence with the Lomnice, the eastern border is formed by the Otava, and then, again after their confluence, it continues as the Vltava River. The Orlík Reservoir, built on the Vltava, begins in the northeastern part of the municipality.

Sights
The main landmark and the oldest monument is the Church of Saint Catherine, built in the second half of the 13th century. Another monuments are the Baroque castle from the 18th century and a historic stone bridge, also from the 18th century.

In popular culture
The 1998 award-winning film Sekal Has to Die was shot in the municipality.

Notable people
Josef Bílý (1872–1941), general

References

External links

Villages in Písek District